College Republicans are college and university students who support the Republican Party of the United States. Many members belong to the organization National Federation of College Republicans (NFCR), College Republican National Committee (CRNC), College Republicans United (CRU), or various independent statewide organizations and campus clubs. The College Republicans are known as an active recruiting tool for the party and have produced many prominent Republican and conservative activists and introduced more party members to the Republican party than any other organization in the nation.

Notable Organizations

As of 2023, notable national College Republican organizations include:

 National Federation of College Republicans (NFCR)
 College Republican National Committee (CRNC)
 College Republicans United (CRU)

As of 2023, notable state College Republican organizations include:

California College Republicans
New York Federation of College Republicans
Wisconsin Federation of College Republicans
North Dakota Federation of College Republicans
Missouri Federation of College Republicans
Ohio Federation of College Republicans
Texas Federation of College Republicans
Mississippi Federation of College Republicans
New Hampshire Federation of College Republicans

Governance of organizations

National Federation of College Republicans (NFCR)
Founded in 2022, the National Federation of College Republicans (NFCR) is a national organization and oversight body for 23 state federations. The NFCR National Chairwoman and the national leadership team, including a national vice-chair, a national treasurer, a national secretary, a national parliamentarian, an executive director, 4 regional vice-chairs, and 3 national committeemen. The current National Chairwoman is Rachel Howard of Louisiana. Carter Fortman of Missouri serves as vice-chair, and William Terry of Wisconsin serves as Treasurer. Notable state federations include Wisconsin, Louisiana, Missouri, Utah, Connecticut, Alabama, North Carolina, Delaware, New Mexico, Michigan, Idaho, North Dakota, Ohio, and the District of Columbia.

College Republican National Committee (CRNC)
The College Republican National Committee (CRNC), is a national organization and oversight body for 12 state federations. The CRNC National Chairwoman and the national leadership team, including an executive director, political director, finance director, comptroller, national field director, treasurer, national secretary, and 4 regional vice-chairs, are elected at the bi-annual College Republican Convention. The current CRNC National Chairwoman is Courtney Britt. In recent years, CRNC has been accused of meddling in national elections, as well as fabricating claims of sexual assault against candidates.

College Republicans United (CRU)
College Republicans United (CRU) is a national organization and oversight body for 6 state federations and 40 chapters across the United States. CRU is run by a Board of Directors, of which each state federation chairman elects to represent them at the committee.

State federations
There are 52 College Republican state federations, each either affiliated with the NFCR, CRNC, CRU, or independent. Each federation administers the College Republican activities at the state level, and in the District of Columbia. The state federations of New York, Texas, and Mississippi, as well as the federation for U.S. territory of Puerto Rico, are independent from the any national federation. The state federation leadership team, which includes a state chairperson and other officers, serve as the primary link between local university chapters and the national federation. The state chairman serves as the representative for College Republicans when dealing with the state Republican Party, local media, and governmental entities. State federations are responsible for organizing and assisting local chapters with securing proper credentials, recruitment efforts, and campus voter canvasses. It is a state federation's responsibility to organize and implement activities for statewide campaigns. Like the national organization, state federations operate as non-profit associations that are not legally affiliated with the Republican Party.

Campus chapters
The college and university-based chapters of College Republicans operate in a dual capacity as student clubs associated with a particular campus and as members of their state federation and, if applicable, the NFCR, CRNC, or CRU. Like the state federations and national committees, the campus chapters are affiliated with their local Republican Party, but are not official arms of that organization. The chapter chairperson and leadership team are responsible for maintaining the campus club's credentials and constitution, and representing the College Republicans when dealing with university administration, other student groups, and in the surrounding community. The campus chapter leadership team might include many members, with administrative responsibilities delegated to dormitory and Greek chapter chairpersons.

Activities

During  election season, campus chapters are responsible for organizing and implementing the campus canvas, running mock elections, managing the local get-out-the-vote efforts. At other times, the campus chapters will organize issue advocacy and lobbying efforts, welcome conservative guest speakers to campus, and organize social events and other recruitment activities.

Generally, the hired field representative or chapter chair begins the school year with membership tables on campus for recruitment. Members use door-to-door canvassing and word of mouth to identify and register as many Republican voters among the student body as possible. These individuals are encouraged to vote through an absentee ballot and assist the candidates with election day Get Out The Vote efforts. Chapters occasionally run student mock elections and other special events as a means to gain positive earned media attention for a candidate.

Gallery

See also

 College Republican National Committee (CRNC)
List of Chairpersons of the College Republicans
 Republican National Committee
 Young Republicans
 Teenage Republicans
 The New York Young Republican Club
 College Democrats of America
 College Democrats

References

External links
 College Republican National Committee – CRNC Website
 College Republican National Committee's IRS Filing Forms
College Republicans United — CRU Website

 
Republican Party (United States) organizations
Student organizations established in 1892
527 organizations
Conservative organizations in the United States
Student wings of political parties in the United States
Youth politics in the United States
International Young Democrat Union
Youth wings of political parties in the United States